Long Lost Family is an American documentary television series based on the Dutch series Spoorloos created by broadcaster KRO-NCRV that premiered on March 6, 2016, on TLC. Presented by Chris Jacobs and Lisa Joyner, the show helps provide aid to individuals looking to be reunited with long-lost biological family members. The show is produced by Shed Media for TLC, and is co-sponsored by Ancestry.com, which provides family history research and DNA testing to help make discoveries possible.

Format
The show follows the original British series very closely, offering a chance for people who are desperate to find long lost relatives. The series helps a handful of people, some of whom have been searching in vain for many years, find the family members they are desperately seeking. It explores the background and context of each family's estrangement and tracks the detective work and often complex and emotional process of finding each lost relative before they are reunited. With the help and support of Chris and Lisa, each relative is guided and supported through the process of tracing the member of their family they have been desperately seeking.

Episodes

Season 1 (2016)

Season 2 (Spring 2017)

Season 3 (Fall 2017)

Season 4 (Spring 2018)

Season 5 (Fall 2018)

Season 6 (Fall 2019)

Production

Development
On February 2, 2016, it was announced that TLC had given the production a series order. It was reported that the series would be hosted by Chris Jacobs and Lisa Joyner and produced by Shed Media.

Season one of Long Lost Family premiered on March 6, 2016. On June 9, 2016, it was announced that TLC had renewed the series for a second season. Season 3 had 6 additional episodes for 2017 and began airing on November 6, 2017. On March 20, 2018, it was announced that the series had been renewed for a third season set to premiere on April 8, 2018. On September 7, 2018, it was announced that additional episodes for 2018 were expected to premiere on October 8, 2018.

Marketing
Alongside the initial series announcement, TLC released the first teaser trailer for the series. On March 20, 2018, TLC released the official trailer for season three.

International versions
The original British program began airing in 2011 and has so far distributed 9 seasons. It is hosted by Davina McCall and Nicky Campbell.

There is also a Norwegian version of called  that has been airing on Norwegian channel TV 2 since 2010 with 6 seasons so far.
 
An Australian version of Long Lost Family, hosted by Chrissie Swan and Anh Do, began airing around the same time as the U.S. version in 2016, but was canceled by 2017.

References

External links

2010s American documentary television series
2016 American television series debuts
2019 American television series endings
English-language television shows
TLC (TV network) original programming
Television series about family history
Television series by Warner Bros. Television Studios